The IX Tactical Air Command was a formation of the United States Army Air Forces. It fought in the European theater of World War II.

History
Formed in the United Kingdom during 1943 as the IX Air Support Command, its primary role was to provide close air support for the U.S. First Army. Re-designated as the IX Tactical Air Command in April 1944, its initial missions included interdicting transportation, disrupting communications and destroying warehouses and supply dumps in occupied France and the Low Countries in preparation for the Normandy Invasion in June. Targets included bridges, road junctions, railroads, airfields, radio towers and telephone exchanges. Engaging enemy aircraft in the air and establishing air superiority was another priority.

After the Normandy landings on 6 June 1944, IX Tactical Air Command Republic P-47 Thunderbolts concentrated on enemy targets in the Cotentin Peninsula area and afterward supported Operation Cobra, the breakout of Normandy. Paying particular attention to German forces in the Falaise-Argentan Gap, targets were expanded to include tanks, vehicles of all types and troop formations.  Many times targets of opportunity on the ground were spontaneously attacked when spotted. Coordinated attacks were made with Allied ground forces, especially when they were being held up by strong defenses. Thunderbolts dropped bombs at low level, made rocket attacks and strafed enemy positions with demoralizing effect.  

Wing headquarters and subordinate units operated primarily from liberated airfields and temporary Advanced Landing Grounds. Moving into north-central France, its groups attacked enemy targets near Paris and then concentrated its activity north-west across Belgium and into the southern Netherlands.   In December 1944 and January 1945 it engaged targets on the north flank of the Battle of the Bulge, then concentrated eastward into the Northern Rhineland as part of the Western Allied invasion of Germany.

The First Army was closely supported as it crossed the Rhine River at Remagen after which attacks were made on ground targets in the Ruhr district where air support was given to Allied forces that had encircled a large concentration of German troops in the Ruhr Pocket. That operation essentially ended organized enemy resistance in western Germany. The First Army halted its advance at the Elbe River in late April 1945 after which the wing engaged targets of opportunity in enemy-controlled areas until the fighting ended on 5 May 1945.

The IX Tactical Air Command remained in Europe after the war as part of United States Air Forces in Europe (USAFE), performing occupation duty and the destruction or shipment to the United States of captured enemy combat equipment. Assigned units also performed air defense duty over the American Zone of Occupation.  It returned to the United States and was inactivated during October 1945.

Lineage
 Constituted as the IX Air Support Command on 29 November 1943
 Activated on 4 December 1943
 Redesignated IX Tactical Air Command c. 24 April 1944
 Inactivated on 25 October 1945
 Disbanded on 8 October 1948

Assignments
 Ninth Air Force, 4 December 1943 
 Unknown, 17 August 1945 – 25 October 1945

Components
 Wings
 70th Fighter Wing: 3 October 1944 – 2 December 1945
 71st Fighter Wing: 1944
 84th Fighter Wing: 30 April 1944 – 12 August 1945
 100th Fighter Wing: 12 December 1943 – 4 January 1944; 1 February − 1 March 1944; 1 March − 15 April 1944

 Groups

 36th Fighter Group: 28 January – 15 November 1945
 48th Fighter-Bomber Group (later 48th Fighter Group): 31 March 1944 – 28 April 1945
 50th Fighter Group:  4 April – 29 September 1944 (under operational control of 84th Fighter Wing after 7 April 1944)
 67th Tactical Reconnaissance Group (later 67th Reconnaissance Group): February 1944 – 19 September 1945
 358th Fighter Group: Attached 1 August-1 October 1944; 1 October 1944-16 January 1945
 362d Fighter Group:  Attached 13 April-1 August 1944
 363d Fighter Group:  Attached 23 December 1943 – 1 August 1944
 365th Fighter Group: Attached 22 December 1943 – 1 August 1944; 1 August-1 October 1944
 366th Fighter Group: 15 February – 1 October 1944; 22 October 1944 – 28 January 1945
 367th Fighter Group: Attached 3 October 1944 – 16 January 1945
 368th Fighter Group: Attached 1 August-1 October 1944; 1 October 1944-16 January 1945
 370th Fighter Group: Attached 1 August-1 October 1944; 1 October 1944-1 February 1945
 404th Fighter Group: 16 January – 1 August 1945; Attached 1 August-26 October 1944
 405th Fighter-Bomber Group (later 405th Fighter Group), assigned March – June 1944; attached 5 August − c. September1944)
 474th Fighter Group: Attached 1 August 1944 – 21 November 1945

 Squadrons
 4th Air Support Control Squadron: 12 December 1943 – 4 March 1944
 6th Air Support Communications Squadron (later 6th Tactical Air Communications Squadron): 26 February – 15 September 1944
 11th Air Support Control Squadron: 26 February – 4 March 1944
 39th Photographic Reconnaissance Squadron: flight attached 6 January – 10 March 1945
 153d Liaison Squadron: 25 April 1944 – 15 July  1945 (attached to Twelfth Army Group after 15 November 1944
 155th Photographic Reconnaissance Squadron: 12 July – 1 August 1945
 422d Night Fighter Squadron: 12 March – 4 May 1944; 7 October 1944-30 September 1945

 Other
 555th Signal Aircraft Warning Battalion, 13 September 1944 – 22 February 1945

Stations

 RAF Aldermaston (AAF-467), England, 4 December 1943
 RAF Middle Wallop (AAF-449), England, February 1944
 RAF Uxbridge (AAF-409), England, 15 February–June 1944
 Au Gay, France, 10 June 1944
 Les Oubeaux, France, 2 July 1944
 Canisy, France, 2 August 1944
 Coulouvray-Boisbenâtre, France, 12 August 1944
 Haleine, France, 22 August 1944
 Versailles, France, 2 September 1944
 Janoulx, Belgium, 11 September 1944
 Verviers, Belgium, 2 October 1944
 Brühl, Germany, 26 March 1945
 Marburg, Germany, 8 April 1945
 Weimar Airfield (R-7), Germany, 26 April 1945
 AAF Station Fritzlar (Y-86), Germany, 26 June–September 1945
 Camp Shanks, New York, 24–25 October 1945

References

Notes
 Explanatory notes

 Citations

Bibliography

External links
Stars and Stripes,  Achtung Jabos! The Story of the IX TAC (World War II Stars & Stripes unit history)

09
Military units and formations established in 1943
Military units and formations disestablished in 1948